Erville Alderson (September 11, 1882 – August 4, 1957) was an American character actor, usually portraying strong-willed or wise men. He appeared in nearly 200 films between 1918 and 1957.

Life
Alderson was born in Kansas City, Missouri. He married Lillian Worth, an American actress, on January 14, 1918 in Sydney, Cape Breton Island, Nova Scotia.  By 1925, the couple were divorced. Alderson's work in films included portraying Jefferson Davis as a young Army officer in Santa Fe Trail (1940). Alderson died in Glendale, California. He is buried in lot 299, section 12 of the Hollywood Forever Cemetery near Los Angeles.

Selected filmography

Her Man (1918) as 'Old Milt' McBrian
The Good-Bad Wife (1920) as Col. Denbigh
The White Rose (1923) as Man of the World
The Exciters (1923) as Chloroform Charlie
America (1924) as Justice Montague
Isn't Life Wonderful (1924) as The Professor
Sally of the Sawdust (1925) as Judge Henry L. Foster
Lightnin' (1925) as Courtroom Attendant (uncredited)
The White Black Sheep (1926) as Yasuf
The Fortune Hunter (1927) as Blinky Lockwood
Salvation Jane (1927) as Gramp
The Price of Honor (1927) as Ogden Bennett
The Heart of Maryland (1927) as Maj. Gen. Kendrick
The Girl from Chicago (1927) as Colonel Carlton
The Valley of the Giants (1927) as Councilman
A Thief in the Dark (1928) as Armstrong
Fazil (1928) as Iman Idris
Fleetwing (1928) as Trad Ben Sabam
Speakeasy (1929) as City Editor
Acquitted (1929) as Prison Warden (uncredited)
Guilty? (1930)
The Lash (1930)
The Dawn Trail (1930)
Shanghaied Love (1931)
They Call It Sin (1932)
Haunted Gold (1932)
The Thirteenth Guest (1932)
The Fighting Code (1933)
Lazy River (1934)
Square Shooter (1935)
Hearts in Bondage (1936)
Lincoln in the White House (1939)
The Mighty Treve (1937)
Jesse James (1939)
Santa Fe Trail (1940) as Jefferson Davis
The Grapes of Wrath (1940) as Arkansas Storekeeper (uncredited)
Abe Lincoln in Illinois (1940) as Stonewall Jackson (uncredited)
Parachute Battalion (1941)
Sergeant York (1941) as Nate Tomkins
Man from Frisco (1944)
An American Romance (1944) as Olson
Objective, Burma! (1945)
The Bishop's Wife (1947) as Stevens (Mrs. Hamilton's butler)
Again Pioneers (1950)

References

External links

1882 births
1957 deaths
American male silent film actors
Male actors from Missouri
Male actors from Kansas City, Kansas
20th-century American male actors
Burials at Hollywood Forever Cemetery
Male Western (genre) film actors